Political Animal or Political Animals may refer to:

 A term used by the ancient Greek philosopher Aristotle in his Politics to refer to a human being
 Political Animals (TV miniseries), a United States drama
 Political Animal (radio show), a British comedy show
 Political Animals (rugby), a sports team of politicians
 Political Animals (video game), a 2016 government simulation game
 "Political Animal", a blog hosted at Washington Monthly magazine
 Political Animals, a documentary film featuring the first openly LGBT California legislators; see California Legislative LGBTQ Caucus

See also
 Non-human electoral candidates